The African shrike-flycatcher or red-eyed shrike-flycatcher (Megabyas flammulatus) is a species of bird in the family Vangidae. It is monotypic within the genus Megabyas.
It is found in Angola, Benin, Cameroon, Central African Republic, Republic of the Congo, Democratic Republic of the Congo, Ivory Coast, Equatorial Guinea, Gabon, Gambia, Ghana, Guinea, Kenya, Liberia, Mali, Nigeria, Sierra Leone, South Sudan, Tanzania, Togo, Uganda, and Zambia.
Its natural habitats are subtropical or tropical dry forests and subtropical or tropical moist lowland forests.

References

External links
Image at ADW

African shrike-flycatcher
African shrike-flycatcher
African shrike-flycatcher
African shrike-flycatcher
Taxonomy articles created by Polbot